Marivirga lumbricoides is a Gram-negative, aerobic, rod-shaped and heterotrophic bacterium from the genus of Marivirga which has been isolated from water from the South China Sea.

References

Cytophagia
Bacteria described in 2015